Marbella Casanova Calam (born 16 May 1958) is a Mexican politician affiliated with the Party of the Democratic Revolution. As of 2014 she served as Deputy of the LIX Legislature of the Mexican Congress as a plurinominal representative.

References

1958 births
Living people
Politicians from Yucatán (state)
Women members of the Chamber of Deputies (Mexico)
Members of the Chamber of Deputies (Mexico)
Party of the Democratic Revolution politicians
21st-century Mexican politicians
21st-century Mexican women politicians
Deputies of the LIX Legislature of Mexico